Adhalaiyur is a village in Nagapattinam district in Tamil Nadu State of India.

References

Villages in Nagapattinam district